Oh Won-seok (Hangul: 오원석) (born April 23, 2001, in Seongnam, Gyeonggi) is a South Korean pitcher for the SSG Landers in the Korea Baseball Organization (KBO).

References 

SSG Landers players
KBO League pitchers
South Korean baseball players
2001 births
Living people
People from Seongnam
Sportspeople from Gyeonggi Province